A NACA duct, also sometimes called a NACA scoop or NACA inlet, is a common form of low-drag air inlet design, originally developed by the U.S. National Advisory Committee for Aeronautics (NACA), the precursor to NASA, in 1945.

Design
Prior submerged inlet experiments showed poor pressure recovery due to the slow-moving boundary layer entering the inlet. The NACA design is believed to work because the combination of the gentle ramp angle and the curvature profile of the walls creates counter-rotating vortices which deflect the boundary layer away from the inlet and draws in the faster moving air, while avoiding the form drag and flow separation that can occur with protruding scoop designs.

Aircraft applications

When properly implemented, a NACA duct allows air to flow into an internal duct, often for cooling purposes, with a minimal disturbance to the flow. The design was originally called a submerged inlet, since it consists of a shallow ramp with curved walls recessed into the exposed surface of a streamlined body, such as an aircraft. 

This type of flush inlet generally cannot achieve the larger ram pressures and flow volumes of an external design, and so is rarely used for the jet engine intake application for which it was originally designed, such as the North American YF-93 and Short SB.4 Sherpa. It is commonly used for piston engine and ventilation intakes.

Automobile applications

It is especially favored in racing car design. Sports cars featuring prominent NACA ducts include the Ferrari F40, the Lamborghini Countach, the 1996-2002 Dodge Viper, the 1971-1973 Ford Mustang, the 1973 Pontiac GTO, the Porsche 911 GT2, the 1979 Porsche 924 Turbo, and the Nissan S130.  It is also prevalent in some motorcycle designs, such as the 1994-1997 Honda VFR750F.

See also
 NACA airfoil
 NACA cowling

References

Further reading

 
 

Engine technology
Aerodynamics
Duct